Samiksha Singh (born 8 October 1979), known mononoymously as Sameksha, is an Indian film and television actress. She has played a range of characters in various series and films, in multiple languages including Tamil, Telugu, Punjabi, Hindi and Kannada. She has directed multiple music videos and also known for producing a film named 'Max, Min and Meowzaki' along with her husband, Shael Oswal under their production house - SSO Productions.

Personal life
Samiksha is a Punjabi and she was born on 8 October 1979 in Chandigarh. Samiksha later relocated to Mumbai to pursue a career in acting and eventually became a director and a producer at SSO Production. 

In July 2020, Samiksha married singer Shael Oswal in Singapore.

Career
Samiksha made her debut in the film industry when director Puri Jagannadh cast her as the lead in the 2004 Telugu film 143. Months later, she subsequently appeared in the 2005 Tamil film Arinthum Ariyamalum, where she starred opposite Navdeep and Arya.

Samiksha earned further success with the 2014 drama Fateh, following which she was awarded the Balraj Sahni Honour Award for contributions to Punjabi cinema. Samiksha's role in Vaapsi (2016) was critically acclaimed in various film festivals.

Samiksha, alongside film work, made her television debut on Sahara One's Zaara – Pyaar ki Saugat, in the titular role. She also played a parallel lead role in the long-running soap opera Yahaaan Main Ghar Ghar Kheli on Zee TV. She also portrayed the role of Roshni in the crime thriller Arjun on Star Plus, followed by a stint in the political thriller, P.O.W.- Bandi Yuddh Ke.

From 2017 to 2018, she portrayed Olympias in Sony TV's historical drama Porus opposite an ensemble cast of Laksh Lalwani, Rohit Purohit and Rati Pandey.

In 2018, she played Parminder in the Star Plus sitcom Khichdi Returns. From 2018 to 2019, she played Saudamini in Colors TV's Tantra.

Filmography

Films

Television

References

External links

 
 

Indian film actresses
Actresses in Tamil cinema
Living people
1979 births
Actresses in Telugu cinema
Actresses from Chandigarh
Indian television actresses
21st-century Indian actresses
Actresses in Hindi television
Actresses in Kannada cinema
Actresses in Hindi cinema
Actresses in Punjabi cinema